The Diary of River Song is an audio play series from Big Finish Productions. Alex Kingston reprises her character River Song from the television series Doctor Who.

Background
The series is one of the first to prominently feature elements from the revived era (2005 on) of the show; the character of River Song was introduced in "Silence in the Library" (2008) as a time traveller with a mysterious connection to the Tenth Doctor, who does not recognize her. The Rulers of the Universe, the fourth episode of Series 1, sees River crossing paths with the Eighth Doctor, a still younger incarnation. River would appear, again, alongside The Eighth Doctor starting with Doom Coalition 2 and concluding in Doom Coalition 4.

The second series of The Diary of River Song features encounters with both the Sixth and Seventh Doctors. The third series, announced September 2017, features an encounter with the Fifth Doctor with Frances Barber reprising her role of Madame Kovarian.

Announced in October 2017, Big Finish confirmed that River Song would return for a fourth and fifth series to be released in 2018 and 2019 respectively. The fourth series features an encounter with the Fourth Doctor; whilst the fifth series features encounters with multiple versions of The Master.

Big Finish subsequently renewed The Diary of River Song in October 2018, for a further two more series (the sixth and seventh) to be released in 2019 and 2020. In August 2020, the series was confirmed as renewed for its eighth series. Big Finish Productions revealed in July 2021 a ninth series, uniting River with the Third Doctor, UNIT and Liz Shaw, would debut in October 2021. A tenth series was revealed by Big Finish in March 2022 to debut in July 2022.

Cast

Notable guests

Alexander Vlahos as Bertie Potts 
Joanna Horton & Nina Toussaint-White as Brooke 
Frances Barber as Madame Kovarian 
Michelle Gomez as Missy 
Geoffrey Beevers, Eric Roberts & Derek Jacobi as The Master 
Claudia Grant as Susan Foreman 
Jamie Glover as Ian Chesterton 
Jemma Powell as Barbara Wright 
Ralph Watson as Captain Knight 
Christopher Benjamin as Henry Gordon Jago 
John Leeson as K9 
Jane Slavin as Anya Kingdom 
Joe Sims as Mark Seven 
Jon Culshaw as The Brigadier & The Master 
Daisy Ashford as Liz Shaw 
Mimî M. Khayisa as Other River Song 
Harry Peacock as Proper Dave 
Isla Blair as Older Mary Mortimer 
Wendy Craig as Older Maddie Mortimer 
Jemima Rooper as Mary Mortimer

Episodes

Series 1 (2015)

Series 2 (2016)

Series 3 (2018)

Series 4 (2018)

Series 5 (2019)

Series 6 (2019)

Series 7 (2020)

Series 8 (2021)

Series 9: New Recruit  (2021)

Series 10: Two Rivers and a Firewall (2022)

Series 11: Friend of the Family (2023)

Awards and nominations

References

Audio plays based on Doctor Who
Big Finish Productions
Doctor Who spin-offs